Yancy cabin may refer to:

Yates Tavern, a historic tavern located near Gretna, Pittsylvania County, Virginia
Yancy cabin in Gretna, Virginia, part of the Historic American Buildings Survey